Finding Hope Now is a 2010 Gang/Crime film starring Stelio Savante, Michael Badalucco, Avan Jogia, Rolando Monge and Nick Rey Angelus.

Cast
 Michael Badalucco as Roger Minassian
Mick Wingert as Young Roger Minassian
 Avan Jogia as Santos Delgado
 Nick Rey Angelus as Reynaldo Sanchez
 Raymond Castelan as Gabriel
 Deep Rai as Basketball Player
 Heidi Harian as Mrs. Hurtado
 Christopher Maleki as Mr. Delgado
 Danny Mora as Reverend Sergio Martinez
 Tia Texada as Mrs. Villanueva
 Stelio Savante as Ruben
 Sean Michael Thomas as Guy Pushed In Fountain
 Scott Seargeant as Pizza Pit Manager

Production
The film was shot in Fresno, California, principal photography wrapping in June 2009. It is based on Roger Minassian's 2003 book Gangs to Jobs.

References

External links
 
 

2010 films
American crime drama films
Hood films
Films about evangelicalism
Films based on non-fiction books
2010 crime drama films
2010s English-language films
2010s American films